Enoch Reader was an Irish Dean in the last decade of the 17th century and the first decade of the 18th.

A former Dean of Kilmore, Reader was  Dean of Emly from 1700 until 1709.

References

Irish Anglicans
Deans of Kilmore
Deans of Emly